Elena Pop-Hossu-Longin (26 November 1862 – 15 May 1940) was an Austro-Hungarian-born Romanian writer, journalist, socialist, suffragist and women's rights activist.

Biography
Elena Pop was born in Szilágyillésfalva (Băsești) (Szilágy County, Austria-Hungary) in the family of Maria Loșonți and the politician, Gheorghe Pop de Băsești.

In 1882, she married lawyer Francisc Hossu-Longin.

Pop-Hossu-Longin was a leading figure of the Romanian women's movement and engaged in the struggle for equal rights between men and women, particularly in regards to education. She was co-founder of Reuniunea Femeilor Române Sălăjene (Union of Romanian Women of Sălaj) in 1880, co-founder of Reuniunea Femeilor Române Hunedorene (Union of Romanian Women of Hunedoara) in 1886 and its president from 1895 to 1918.

Awards
 1879, received the Decoration of the Cross of Queen Elisabeth in recognition for the fundraising she carried out for the soldiers wounded in the Romanian War of Independence.

References

Sources
 Francisca de Haan, Krasimira Daskalova & Anna Loutfi: Biographical Dictionary of Women's Movements and Feminisms in Central, Easterna and South Eastern Europe, 19th and 20th centuries. Central European University Press, 2006
 George Marcu (coord.), Dicţionarul personalităţilor feminine din România, Editura Meronia, București, 2009.

1862 births
1940 deaths
People from Maramureș County
Romanian Austro-Hungarians
Romanian women's rights activists
Romanian feminists
Romanian socialist feminists
19th-century Romanian people